Tony Persson (born 10 June 1959) is a former Swedish football player.

During his club career, Persson played for Kalmar FF and GAIS.

Persson made 12 appearances for the Sweden national football team between 1981 and 1982, scoring 2 goals.

External links

1959 births
Swedish footballers
Sweden international footballers
Kalmar FF players
GAIS players
Association football midfielders
Living people